Fort Klamath was a military outpost near the western end of the Oregon Trail, between Crater Lake National Park and Upper Klamath Lake in Klamath County, Oregon, United States. The Fort Klamath Site, about a mile southeast of the present community of Fort Klamath, Oregon, is listed on the U.S. National Register of Historic Places

History
Fort Klamath was established in 1863, and was an important Army post during conflicts with the Klamath, Modoc, and Northern Paiute tribes.  The fort consisted of more than 50 buildings, including a sawmill. Four Modoc men, led by Kintpuash, were executed there in 1873 for the killing of General Edward Canby. Their graves remain at the fort.

A post office was opened in 1879. By the mid-1880s, the settlers in the area no longer needed protection, and in 1889 the decision was made to close the fort.

Fort Klamath Museum
An  parcel within the fort area is maintained as a park and museum by Klamath County, Oregon. The Fort Klamath Museum is housed in a modern structure designed after the fort's guardhouse and standing in the original guardhouse location.

The Fort Klamath site was added to the National Register of Historic Places in 1971.

See also
 Modoc War

References

External links
 Klamath County Museums

Klamath
Closed installations of the United States Army
Military and war museums in Oregon
Museums in Klamath County, Oregon
National Register of Historic Places in Klamath County, Oregon
Klamath
Oregon in the American Civil War
1863 establishments in Oregon
1890 disestablishments in Oregon
Klamath
Snake War